Wayne County is the most populous county in the U.S. state of Michigan. As of 2020, the United States Census placed its population at 1,793,561, making it the 19th-most populous county in the United States. The county seat is Detroit. The county was founded in 1796 and organized in 1815. Wayne County is included in the Detroit-Warren-Dearborn, MI Metropolitan Statistical Area. It is one of several U.S. counties named after Revolutionary War-era general Anthony Wayne.

History

Wayne County was the sixth county in the Northwest Territory, formed August 15, 1796 from portions of territorial Hamilton County, territorial Knox County and unorganized territory. It was named for the U.S. general "Mad Anthony" Wayne.  It originally encompassed the entire area of the Lower Peninsula of Michigan, most of the Upper Peninsula, as well as smaller sections that are now part of northern Ohio, Indiana, Illinois and Wisconsin. By proclamation of the Territorial Secretary and Acting Governor, Winthrop Sargent, on August 15, 1796, the boundaries of Wayne County were declared to begin at the mouth of the Cuyahoga River then west to Fort Wayne, then to the southernmost point of Lake Michigan and along the western shore north to the territorial boundary in Lake Superior and then along the territorial boundary through Lake Huron, Lake St. Clair, and Lake Erie back to the starting point. The first division of the county into townships occurred November 1, 1798, into the four townships of Detroit, Hamtramck, Mackinaw, and Sargent. The extent of Wayne county at that time included all the present state of Michigan in addition to parts of Indiana, Ohio, and Wisconsin, so that the townships erected at that time were vastly larger than the corresponding divisions of the present time.

On January 14, 1803, the Governor of Indiana Territory, William Henry Harrison, issued a similar proclamation defining the boundaries as beginning at a point where an east and west line passing through the southernmost extreme of Lake Michigan would intersect a north and south line, passing through the westernmost extreme of the lake, then north to the territorial boundary, then along said boundary line to a point where an east and west line passing through the southerly extreme of Lake Michigan would intersect the same, then along this last mentioned line to the place of beginning. This boundary would include Chicago, Illinois and a sizable strip of Wisconsin along Lake Michigan.

These boundaries would be adjusted as Indiana and Illinois became states and as other counties were formed within Michigan Territory.

Geography
Its water area includes  parts of the Detroit River and Lake St. Clair.

Wayne County borders on Oakland County and Macomb County to the north, Washtenaw County to the west, Essex County, Ontario, Canada to the east, and Monroe County to the south.

The eastern (and sometimes southern) boundary is a water boundary in the Detroit River and Lake St. Clair with Essex County, Ontario.  Automotive traffic crosses this boundary at the Detroit-Windsor Tunnel and the Ambassador Bridge.  Due to the southwestern course of the river, this small portion of Canada actually lies to the south of Wayne County.  The southern communities of the county are usually referred to as "Downriver", in reference to their location downstream of downtown Detroit.

Grosse Ile is the largest island in Wayne County and is connected to the mainland by the Wayne County Bridge and the Grosse Ile Toll Bridge.

Adjacent counties
 Washtenaw County  (west)
 Monroe County  (south/southwest)
 Macomb County  (northeast)
 Oakland County  (northwest)
 Essex County, Ontario, Canada (east/southeast)

National protected area
 Detroit River International Wildlife Refuge (part)

Transportation

Wayne County Department of Public Services
The Wayne County Department of Public Services was formed in 1906 as the Wayne County Road Commission. It was the government agency in Wayne County, Michigan responsible for building and maintaining the county's roads and highways.

Its first commissioners were Edward N. Hines, Cassius R. Benton, and automobile manufacturer Henry Ford.  While the commission was authorized by an 80% positive vote of county voters in a 1906 referendum, it was controversial and there was a Michigan state supreme court case pressed which found it unconstitutional.  Commissioners Benton and Ford quit, but commissioner Hines persisted and led the commission through reorganization getting around the obstacles.  Hines was a commissioner continuously from 1906 to 1938. Hines is credited with the idea of putting a painted line down a roadway's center to divide traffic, and other innovations that were later widely adopted.

The commission claims credit for constructing the country's first mile of concrete-paved rural highway, a section of Woodward Avenue" just outside the Detroit city limits.

A number of the county road commissions' works are listed on the National Register of Historic Places.

The county road commission was merged into the general county government, becoming the Roads Division of the Department of Public Services.

Major highways
  through the Downriver communities, then through the southwest-side neighborhoods of Detroit and serves as the northern border of Downtown Detroit as the Fisher Freeway. It then turns away from the Fisher onto the Chrysler Freeway at a complex interchange with I-375 and an unnumbered extension which connects with M-3, then follows M-1, which is less than a mile away through the remainder of Detroit, connecting eastern Wayne County to Toledo and Flint to the south and north respectively. It runs non-stop to the Sault Ste. Marie International Bridge to the north and to Florida to the south.
  runs east–west through the central parts of Wayne County, connecting it to Port Huron eastbound and Chicago westbound. To the west it provides an uninterrupted route as far as Montana and connects to the northern side of the Detroit Metro Airport. In Detroit it is known as the Edsel Ford Freeway.
  has its eastern terminus in the county, in Detroit. It follows Grand River Avenue until the city's northwest side, there it turns due west to I-275, where it turns north to concurrent with I-275. West of Detroit to I-275 it is known as the Jeffries Freeway; in Detroit it is the Rosa Parks Memorial Highway, but it is sometimes still known as the Jeffries.
 , most of whose mileage is in Wayne County, serves the southern side of the Detroit Metro Airport.
  is the nation's shortest Interstate Highway to be signed. However some highways are shorter but are not signed at all. It serves as the eastern boundary of Downtown Detroit and is a southern extension of the Chrysler Freeway.
  has its eastern terminus in Downtown Detroit at Cass Avenue. From there it travels through the west side of Detroit and through Dearborn and other points west and is a useful alternative to I-94. US 12 continues west through Michigan, passing through several US cities including Chicago and Minneapolis, eventually ending in the Pacific Northwest in Aberdeen, Washington. Locally it is known as Michigan Avenue.
  traverses through Downriver and the far west sides of Dearborn and Detroit and is a useful alternative to I-75. Locally it is known as Telegraph Road.
  entered the county by two ways. Initially it was via Woodward Avenue but when the Lodge Freeway was completed U.S. Route 10 was relocated onto it; the Woodward route became M-1. Later the existing highway was truncated in Bay City and M-10 replaced it on the Lodge.
  entered Wayne County on Grand River Avenue and ended in Downtown Detroit.
  was the designated name for Dix-Toledo Highway in Downriver and Fort Street and Gratiot Avenue in Detroit. The construction of I-75 resulted in the truncation of U.S. Route 25 to Cincinnati.
  followed Michigan Avenue out of Downtown Detroit and out of Wayne County. Is now a routing of U.S. Route 12.
  has its southern terminus in Downtown Detroit at Adams Street. It travels through Midtown Detroit and New Center and through Highland Park. It serves as an alternative to I-75 and M-10. Locally known as Woodward Avenue. M-1 was a result of US-10 being redesignated to the Lodge Freeway.
  has its southern terminus in Downtown Detroit at Randolph and Jefferson Avenue. It proceeds northeasterly through Detroit's northeast side and beyond towards Mount Clemens and points further north. Locally known as Gratiot Avenue. M-3 was the result of the removal of US-25 from Michigan.
  begins at the northern intersection with I-96 on Detroit's northwest side and follows Grand River Avenue out of the county.
  runs from I-96 to Conant Street in Detroit, passing through Highland Park. The freeway portion is known as the Davison Freeway.
  starts at the same intersection where M-3 starts in Downtown Detroit and travels further into the city on the Lodge Freeway and connects it to Southfield.
  starts at the interchange with I-96 and I-275 in Livonia and travels out into rural areas, serving Plymouth and Ann Arbor.
  starts in Lincoln Park's city center and runs along Southfield Road to Allen Park and becomes the Southfield Freeway, traveling through the west side of Detroit.
  begins at M-3 in Detroit, running through the city and connecting it to the Thumb area of the state. Locally known as Van Dyke Avenue.
 , which is entirely in Wayne County, starts at Griswold Street in Downtown Detroit and connects the city's southwest side to Downriver, ending near Flat Rock at I-75, for whom which M-85 serves as an alternative. Locally known as West Fort and South Fort, divided at the River Rouge.
  only runs a short distance through Detroit's northeast side, starting at M-3. In the city it follows Gunston Street and Hoover Street.
  follows the county line between M-5 and I-94. Locally known as West 8 Mile and East 8 Mile, divided at John R. Street.
  starts at Wyoming Street on the Detroit-Dearborn limit and continues through the western suburbs as Ford Road.
  became part of US 16, which is also removed from Michigan.
  once followed Ecorse Road into Lincoln Park, then ran concurrently with U.S. Route 25 to Downtown Detroit.
  connected US 24 in Monroe to Flat Rock; it once connected to US 112 in Canton along Huron River Drive and Belleville Road.
  entered Wayne County during World War II, and the years following, on an expressway, providing access to the Willow Run Airport in Van Buren Township and turned onto present-day Interstate 94 in Romulus Township. In Taylor Township it had interchanges with both M-17 and US 24, then ended at US 112 in Dearborn.
  Dixie Highway ran through Wayne County as early as 1915. Back then it was one of the only routes that connected the county to the Southern United States. Today there are no traces of the old highway in the county.

Airports
  Detroit Metropolitan Wayne County Airport is located in the Downriver community of Romulus. It serves as a hub for Delta Air Lines and Spirit Airlines and is one of the two airports operated by the Wayne County Airport Authority.
  Willow Run Airport is located in Van Buren Township and has four runways (a fifth was recently converted into a taxiway). No scheduled flights operate out of Willow Run and is one of the two airports operated by the Wayne County Airport Authority.
  Grosse Ile Municipal Airport is located about two miles (3.2 km) south of Grosse Ile Township's downtown area. It has two paved runways. No scheduled flights operate out of this airport as well.
  Coleman A. Young International Airport is also known as the Detroit City Airport, which is not to be confused with the larger and nearby Detroit Metro Airport. It is located just a short drive from Downtown Detroit along M-3. It also has two runways and no scheduled flights, although it has been attempted in the past.

Demographics

2020 census

Note: the US Census treats Hispanic/Latino as an ethnic category. This table excludes Latinos from the racial categories and assigns them to a separate category. Hispanics/Latinos can be of any race.

2010 Census
The 2010 United States Census indicates Wayne County had a 2010 population of 1,820,584. This is a decrease of 240,578 people from the 2000 United States Census. Overall, the county had an -11.7% growth rate during this ten-year period. In 2010 there were 702,749 households and 450,651 families in the county. The population density was 2,974.4 per square mile (1,148.4 square kilometers). There were 821,693 housing units at an average density of 1,342.5 per square mile (518.3 square kilometers). 52.3% were White, 40.5% Black or African American, 2.5% Asian, 0.4% Native American, 0.8% of some other race and 2.4%  of two or more races. 5.2% were Hispanic or Latino (of any race). 7.5% were of German, 6.8% Polish and 5.2% Irish ancestry.

There were 702,749 households, out of which 33.1% had children under the age of 18 living with them, 37.4% were husband and wife families, 20.7% had a female householder with no husband present, 35.9% were non-families, and 30.7% were made up of individuals. The average household size was 2.56 and the average family size was 3.22.

In the county, 25.4% of the population was under the age of 18, 9.7% was from 18 to 24, 25.5% from 25 to 44, 26.8% from 45 to 64, and 12.7% was 65 years of age or older. The median age was 37 years. For every 100 females, there were 92.4 males. For every 100 females age 18 and over, there were 88.7 males.

The 2010 American Community Survey 1-year estimate  indicates the median income for a household in the county was $39,408 and the median income for a family was $49,176. Males had a median income of $26,823 versus $17,744 for females. The per capita income for the county was $20,948. About 18.6% of families and 23.7% of the population were below the poverty line, including 34.8% of those under the age 18 and 11.7% of that age 65 or over.

Religion 
According to 2010 statistics, the largest religious group in Wayne County was the Archdiocese of Detroit, with 297,283 Catholics worshipping at 149 parishes, followed by 92,394 non-denominational adherents with 144 congregations, 76,422 NBC Baptists with 110 congregations, an estimated 67,775 Muslims with 38 congregations, 28,021 ABCUSA Baptists with 32 congregations, 22,687 Missouri Synod Lutherans with 52 congregations, 16,043 CoGiC Pentecostals with 66 congregations, 14,689 UMC Methodists with 53 congregations, 14,107 PC-USA Presbyterians with 36 congregations, and 13,199 AME Methodists with 29 congregations. Altogether, 43.3% of the population was claimed as members by religious congregations, although members of historically African-American denominations were underrepresented due to incomplete information. In 2014, Wayne County had 780 religious organizations, the 12th most among all US counties.

Government

Wayne County is Michigan's first "charter county", with a home rule charter setting up its structures within limits set in state law and constitution.  Most Michigan county governments are structured according to state law, without a locally adopted charter. The city is governed pursuant to the Home Rule Charter of Wayne County, Michigan, and the Wayne County Code is the codification of Wayne County's local ordinances. Unless a violation of the code or other ordinance is specifically designated as a municipal civil infraction (or unless expressly otherwise required by applicable state or federal laws), the violation is a misdemeanor.

The county government operates the jail, maintains rural roads, keeps files of deeds and mortgages, maintains vital records for all areas except Detroit, administers public health regulations, and participates with the state in the provision of welfare and other social services.  Most other local government functions – police and fire, building and zoning, tax assessment, street maintenance, etc. – are the responsibility of individual cities and townships.

Elected officials
 County Executive: Warren Evans (Democratic)
 Prosecuting Attorney: Kym Worthy (Democratic)
 Sheriff: Raphael Washington (Democratic)
 County Clerk: Cathy M. Garrett (Democratic)
 County Treasurer: Eric Sabree (Democratic)
 Register of Deeds: Bernard J. Youngblood (Democratic)
 Wayne County Commission: Alisha Bell, Chair (Democratic) 15 members, elected from districts (14 Democrats, 1 Republican)
 Circuit Court (3rd Circuit encompasses Wayne County): 61 judges (non-partisan)
 Probate Court: 8 judges (non-partisan)

(information as of February 2021)

Department of Public Services
Formerly the Wayne County Road Commission, the Department of Public Services is the government agency in Wayne County responsible for building and maintaining the county's roads and highways. A number of the former agency's works are listed on the National Register of Historic Places.

Corrections
The Wayne County Jail Division operates The Andrew C. Baird Detention Facility in Downtown Detroit, The Old Wayne County Jail in Downtown Detroit, and The William Dickerson Detention Facility in Hamtramck.

Politics
Wayne County has backed the Democratic Party candidate for president in every election from 1932 onward, often and more recently by wide margins. From 1896 to 1928, it had always voted Republican for president, or at least more Republican than Democratic.  Its large population has helped swing the election to Democrats in many statewide elections since then, with candidates running up large margins here offsetting Republican majorities in most rural counties of Michigan. The last Republican candidate to carry Wayne County in a statewide election was Candice Miller when she won re-election to the Secretary of State office in 1998.

Federal representation
Wayne County is split between three congressional districts:
 6th
 12th
 13th

Communities

Cities

 Allen Park
 Belleville
 Dearborn
 Dearborn Heights
 Detroit (county seat)
 Ecorse
 Flat Rock (partially in Monroe County, Michigan)
 Garden City
 Gibraltar
 Grosse Pointe
 Grosse Pointe Farms
 Grosse Pointe Park
 Grosse Pointe Shores (partially in Macomb County)
 Grosse Pointe Woods
 Hamtramck
 Harper Woods
 Highland Park
 Inkster
 Lincoln Park
 Livonia
 Melvindale
 Northville (partially in Oakland County)
 Plymouth
 River Rouge
 Riverview
 Rockwood
 Romulus
 Southgate
 Taylor
 Trenton
 Wayne
 Westland
 Woodhaven
 Wyandotte

Charter townships

 Brownstown Charter Township
 Canton Charter Township
 Huron Charter Township
 Northville Charter Township
 Plymouth Charter Township
 Redford Charter Township
 Van Buren Charter Township

Civil townships
 Grosse Ile Township
 Sumpter Township

Unincorporated communities

 Beech
 Belleville North
 Cherry Hill
 Cherry Island
 Conners Creek (former)
 Denton
 Duboisville (former)
 East Rockwoood
 Edgewater Heights
 French Landing
 Grand View Acres
 Maple Beach
 Martinsville
 Milleville Beach
 New Boston
 Rawsonville (partially in Washtenaw County)
 Roulo
 Sheldon
 Waltz
 West Sumpter
 Willow

Education
School districts:

 Airport Community School District
 Allen Park Public Schools
 Crestwood School District
 Flat Rock Community Schools
 Clarenceville School District
 Dearborn City School District
 Dearborn Heights School District 7
 Detroit Public Schools Community District
 Ecorse Public School District
 Garden City School District
 Gibraltar School District
 Grosse Ile Township Schools
 Grosse Pointe Public Schools
 Hamtramck Public Schools
 Harper Woods City Schools
 Highland Park City Schools
 Huron School District
 Lincoln Consolidated School District
 Lincoln Park Public Schools
 Livonia Public Schools
 Melvindale-North Allen Park School District
 Northville Public Schools
 Plymouth-Canton Community Schools
 Redford Union School District
 River Rouge School District
 Riverview Community School District
 Romulus Community Schools
 South Redford School District
 Southgate Community School District
 Taylor School District
 Trenton Public Schools
 Van Buren Public Schools
 Wayne-Westland Community School District
 Westwood Community Schools
 Woodhaven-Brownstown School District
 Wyandotte City School District

Former school districts:
 Inkster City School District

Tertiary institutions:
 Wayne State University
 Henry Ford College
 University of Detroit Mercy

See also

 List of Michigan State Historic Sites in Wayne County, Michigan
 National Register of Historic Places listings in Wayne County, Michigan
 Saginaw Trail
 Sauk Trail
 Woodward Corridor
 Downriver

References

Further reading

External links
 Wayne County Government
 Wayne County Local History
 
 History of the Wayne County Road Commission
 Wayne County Road Commission Photos
 History: Facts about the World's First Mile of Concrete Highway
 Wayne County Code from Municode

 
Michigan counties
Metro Detroit
1815 establishments in Michigan Territory
Populated places established in 1815
Majority-minority counties in the United States